Malakellis is a surname. Notable people with the surname include:

Spiro Malakellis (born 1968), Australian rules footballer
Tony Malakellis (born 1970), Australian rules footballer, brother of Spiro